Mark Gilbert Jr. (born June 1, 1997) is an American football cornerback who is a free agent.

Personal life and high school
Mark Gilbert Jr. was born on June 1, 1997, to Tonya and Mark Gilbert. He was raised in Fayetteville, North Carolina. His uncle is Sean Gilbert, a former Pro Bowl defensive tackle, and his cousin is Darrelle Revis, a four-time All-pro and Super Bowl champion. Gilbert attended Terry Sanford High School, where he played football and basketball.

College career
Rated as a three-star recruit coming out of high school, Gilbert chose to attend Duke University. Going into his freshman year, Gilbert was nominated as a second-team all-ACC freshman. He played in 12 games during his freshman year, starting three of them. In his sophomore year, Gilbert was nominated as a fourth-team All-American before the beginning of the season. Gilbert broke numerous records in his sophomore year, one of which being him becoming the only player in Duke history with 5 or more interceptions and 15 or more passes defended in a single season. In week 2 of his Junior year against Northwestern, Gilbert suffered a season-ending hip injury that caused him to miss the rest of the 2018 college football season, and the entirety of the 2019 college football season. Leading into the 2020 college football season, Gilbert was invited to the NFL combine but opted to remain at Duke. During his fifth year at Duke, he started two games for the Blue Devils before being forced to undergo season-ending surgery on his right foot.

Professional career

Pittsburgh Steelers
After going undrafted in the 2021 NFL Draft, Gilbert was signed as an undrafted free agent by the Pittsburgh Steelers. Gilbert did not make the active roster but was signed to the Steelers' practice squad.

Detroit Lions
Before week 8 of the 2021 NFL season, on October 12, 2021, Gilbert was signed off of the Steelers' practice squad by the Detroit Lions. Gilbert was then made a member of the Lions' active roster. He was waived on August 30, 2022.

Pittsburgh Steelers (second stint)
On October 1, 2022, Gilbert re-signed to the Steelers practice squad.

References

1997 births
Living people
Players of American football from North Carolina
Sportspeople from Fayetteville, North Carolina
American football cornerbacks
Duke Blue Devils football players
Pittsburgh Steelers players
Detroit Lions players